Clinostigma savoryanum, the Pacific beauty palm, arrack tree or noyashi [Japanese ノヤシ], is a species of flowering plant in the family Arecaceae. It is endemic to Ogasawara-shoto (Bonin Islands) of Japan. It is threatened by habitat loss.

References

savoryanum
Flora of the Bonin Islands
Data deficient plants
Plants described in 1919
Taxobox binomials not recognized by IUCN